Frederick Charles Goss (25 May 1914 – 1983) was an English professional footballer who played as an outside right. He made appearances in the English Football League with Aston Villa and Wrexham.

References

1914 births
1983 deaths
English footballers
Association football wingers
English Football League players
Ilkeston Town F.C. players
Aston Villa F.C. players
Wrexham A.F.C. players